Kenneth Jeremy Wieder (born February 1971, also RKJW) is a rosh yeshiva at the Rabbi Isaac Elchanan Theological Seminary of Yeshiva University, located in the Washington Heights neighborhood of Manhattan, New York.  He holds the Gwendolyn and Joseph Straus Chair in Talmud.

Rabbi Wieder was one of the first Americans to win the International Bible Contest, and later graduated summa cum laude from Yeshiva College in 1991, and received an M.S. in American Jewish history from the Bernard Revel Graduate School of Jewish Studies.  In 2005, he received a PhD in Hebrew and Judaic Studies at New York University. He is a resident of Teaneck, New Jersey.

Rabbi Wieder has over 500 lectures on Judaism captured on media and available online.

Rabbi Wieder lives in Teaneck with his wife and two children.

References

External links
Shiurim by Rabbi Wieder
Rabbi Wieder's Blog
Vayavinu - The online home of leining and tefillah resources as well as shiurim by Rabbi Jeremy Wieder  

American Orthodox rabbis
New York University alumni
People from Teaneck, New Jersey
Yeshiva University alumni
Yeshiva University rosh yeshivas
Living people
1971 births